Thanakhan Chaiyasombat (born 26 June 1999) is a Thai cyclist who currently rides for the UCI Continental team .

Major results

2017
 5th Time trial, Asian Junior Road Championships
2018
 6th Overall Tour de Singkarak
1st Stage 4
 7th Road race, Asian Games
2019
 Southeast Asian Games
1st  Team road race
2nd  Time trial
5th Road race
 6th Overall Tour de Singkarak
 9th Time trial, Asian Under-23 Road Championships
2020
 1st  Time trial, National Under-23 Road Championships
 National Road Championships
2nd Time trial
3rd Road race
 6th Overall Tour of Thailand
1st  Young rider classification

References

External links

1999 births
Living people
Thanakhan Chaiyasombat
Cyclists at the 2018 Asian Games
Thanakhan Chaiyasombat
Competitors at the 2019 Southeast Asian Games
Southeast Asian Games medalists in cycling
Thanakhan Chaiyasombat
Thanakhan Chaiyasombat
Thanakhan Chaiyasombat
Thanakhan Chaiyasombat